Woody Pitney is an Australian singer/songwriter, previously signed to Universal Music. His song "You Can Stay" is featured on the weg.de travel commercial in Germany. The positive reception of his song from the advertising campaign led to Pitney charting on the iTunes Singer/Songwriter charts in several European countries while still an independent artist. "You Can Stay" was released by Universal Music / Electrola on 27 June 2014. He released his new single 'A Little Too Late' in June, 2018.

References

External links
Official website
Woody Pitney at Universal Music

Living people
Australian singer-songwriters
Year of birth missing (living people)